Urodacus hartmeyeri is a species of scorpion in the Urodacidae family. It is endemic to Australia, and was first described in 1908 by German naturalist Karl Kraepelin.

Description
The species grows to about 100 mm in length. Colouration is mainly clay yellow.

Distribution and habitat
The species occurs in Western Australia along the west coast and coastal plain, from North West Cape southwards to Hamel.

References

 

 
similis
Scorpions of Australia
Endemic fauna of Australia
Fauna of Western Australia
Animals described in 1908
Taxa named by Karl Kraepelin